The Orpington or Buff Orpington Duck is a breed of domestic duck. It is a dual-purpose breed used for meat and egg production. It is capable of laying up to 220 eggs a year. Originally created by William Cook of Orpington, Kent, UK, from the selection of mis-marked Blue Orpington Ducks; Cook was also the developer of the Orpington chicken. The breeds used in the development of the breed included Cayuga, Indian Runner, commercial Aylesbury and Rouen. It is proposed that Cook's intentions for the breed were to capitalize on the growing demand for the buff colour pattern.  The Buff Orpington Duck was introduced to the public at the Dairy Show, the Agricultural Hall (q.v.), Islington, London in October 1897. It is considered a threatened breed by the ALBC. This breed was admitted to the British Poultry Standard in 1910 and the American Poultry Associations Standard of Perfection as the 'Buff Duck' in the Medium class in 1914.
The Orpington duck is available in three colour varieties: Buff, Blond and Brown. The Buff Orpington is an unstable colour due to a blue dilution gene which means that from the offspring, all three colour variations will appear.

History 
Ducks with buff coloration are a cross between Indian Runner, Rouen and Aylesbury ducks. Their origin originates from the renowned Orpington farms in England, which is why they are also known as Orpington ducks. The buff-coloured plumage of the breed was developed by a man named William Cook from the same region. During this period, buff was a very fashionable colour. As well as the black, the chocolate, and the blue variations. W.Cook created bibs on the chest that resembled white hearts. The American Poultry Associations recognized them in 1914 after Cook introduced them to the United States at the Madison Square Garden Show in New York City in 1908. By 2011, there were 793 breeding buff ducks in North America, with 11 breeders engaged in breeding the species. As of today, there are five primary breeding flocks with 50 or more breeding birds.

Characteristics

Body size 
Buff Orpington Ducks are medium-sized ducks that range between 7 and 8 pounds in weight. The bird is large and broad, with an oval head and medium-length bill, as well as a gracefully curved neck. The Buff duck's body carries itself 20 degrees above horizontal, and its wings are short and curved.

Coloration 
It has buff plumage and has a yellowish snout and feet, as well as brown eyes. Duck's bills are brown-orange, whereas the drakes' bills are yellow. In the U.S., there existed a blue variety of Orpington duck, but it was most likely absorbed into the Blue Swedish breed. Uniformity is key with regard to colour patterns. Typically, fawn-buff is considered ideal with the drakes having a fawn-buff or seal-brown head. The bill of the drake is yellow while the hen has a brownish-orange bill. They have orange feet and legs. Buff Orpington ducks are typically lighter than their khaki-coloured counterparts as a result of a recessive sex-linked dilution factor. It was found that a deficiency of vitamin U resulted in widespread deposition of black pigment in the feathers of buff orpington ducks, a breed normally not known for black pigmentation.

Diet 
The Buff Orpington duck eats insects, larvae, aquatic invertebrates, seeds, acorns, aquatic vegetation, and grains; they require regular freshwater access.

Breeding 
In general, the Buff offers much to the breeder who is seeking an attractive, dual-purpose bird. It produces 150 to 220 eggs per year and gains weight fairly rapidly, enabling it to be sold within eight to ten weeks of birth.

Conservation status 
The Buff Orpington is listed on the Rare Breed Survival Trust Watch List. The orpingtons are classified as light ducks, but they are on the larger size scale. Their eggs are produced at an average rate of 150 per year, which makes them a Critically Endangered species.

See also
 List of duck breeds

References

 http://www.albc-usa.org/cpl/waterfowl/buffduck.html
 http://www.feathersite.com/Poultry/Ducks/Buffs/BRKBuff.html
 Cook, William.(1897)The Poultry Journal No.138, Vol.12, p. 81-82.
 HOLDERREAD, D., & CENTER, P. (2001). Raising Ducks.
 https://livestockconservancy.org/heritage-breeds/heritage-breeds-list/buff-orpington-duck/
 Malone, P., Gerald D., and Walt L. (1998). The American Standard of Perfection. Mendon, MA: American Poultry Association.
 Thompson, J. M. (2008). The Orpington Ducks.
 Batty, J. (1985). Domesticated ducks and geese. Nimrod Book Services.
 Lancaster, J. F. (2013). The inheritance of plumage colour in the common duck (Anas platyrhynchos Linné). Springer.
 Bender, E. F., Sponenberg, D. P., & Bixby, D. E. (2000). Taking stock of waterfowl: the results of the American livestock breeds conservancy's domestic duck and goose census. Diversity, 16(3), 21–24.
 Decker, A., & McGinnis, J. (1947). Black pigmentation in feathers of buff Orpington chicks caused by vitamin D deficiency. Proceedings of the Society for Experimental Biology and Medicine, 66(1), 224–226.

External links

Duck breeds
Conservation Priority Breeds of the Livestock Conservancy
Duck breeds originating in the United Kingdom
Animal breeds on the RBST Watchlist
Animal breeds on the GEH Red List